Fernandocrambus apocalipsus is a moth in the family Crambidae. It was described by Stanisław Błeszyński in 1967. It is found in Chile.

References

Crambini
Moths described in 1967
Moths of South America
Endemic fauna of Chile